In the mathematical discipline of general topology, a Polish space is a separable completely metrizable topological space; that is, a space homeomorphic to a complete metric space that has a countable dense subset.  Polish spaces are so named because they were first extensively studied by Polish topologists and logicians—Sierpiński, Kuratowski, Tarski and others.  However, Polish spaces are mostly studied today because they are the primary setting for descriptive set theory, including the study of Borel equivalence relations. Polish spaces are also a convenient setting for more advanced measure theory, in particular in probability theory.

Common examples of Polish spaces are the real line, any separable Banach space, the Cantor space, and the Baire space. Additionally, some spaces that are not complete metric spaces in the usual metric may be Polish; e.g., the open interval (0, 1) is Polish.

Between any two uncountable Polish spaces, there is a Borel isomorphism; that is, a bijection that preserves the Borel structure.  In particular, every uncountable Polish space has the cardinality of the continuum.

Lusin spaces, Suslin spaces, and Radon spaces are generalizations of Polish spaces.

Properties
 Every Polish space is second countable (by virtue of being separable metrizable).
(This is the converse to Alexandrov's theorem.)
 (Cantor–Bendixson theorem) If  is Polish then any closed subset of  can be written as the disjoint union of a perfect set and a countable set. Further, if the Polish space  is uncountable, it can be written as the disjoint union of a perfect set and a countable open set.

The following spaces are Polish:
 closed subsets of a Polish space,
 open subsets of a Polish space,
 products and disjoint unions of countable families of Polish spaces,
 locally compact spaces that are metrizable and countable at infinity,
 countable intersections of Polish subspaces of a Hausdorff topological space,
 the set of irrational numbers with the topology induced by the standard topology of the real line.

Characterization

There are numerous characterizations that tell when a second-countable topological space is metrizable, such as Urysohn's metrization theorem.  The problem of determining whether a metrizable space is completely metrizable is more difficult. Topological spaces such as the open unit interval (0,1) can be given both complete metrics and incomplete metrics generating their topology.

There is a characterization of complete separable metric spaces in terms of a game known as the strong Choquet game. A separable metric space is completely metrizable if and only if the second player has a winning strategy in this game.

A second characterization follows from Alexandrov's theorem. It states that a separable metric space is completely metrizable if and only if it is a  subset of its completion in the original metric.

Polish metric spaces
Although Polish spaces are metrizable, they are not in and of themselves metric spaces; each Polish space admits many complete metrics giving rise to the same topology, but no one of these is singled out or distinguished. A Polish space with a distinguished complete metric is called a Polish metric space. An alternative approach, equivalent to the one given here, is first to define "Polish metric space" to mean "complete separable metric space", and then to define a "Polish space" as the topological space obtained from a Polish metric space by forgetting the metric.

Generalizations of Polish spaces

Lusin spaces
A topological space is a Lusin space if it is homeomorphic to a Borel subset of a compact metric space. Some stronger topology makes a Lusin into a Polish space.

There are many ways to form Lusin spaces. In particular:
Every Polish space is Lusin
A subspace of a Lusin space is Lusin if and only if it is a Borel set. 
Any countable union or intersection of Lusin subspaces of a Hausdorff space is Lusin. 
The product of a countable number of Lusin spaces is Lusin. 
The disjoint union of a countable number of Lusin spaces is Lusin.

Suslin spaces
A Suslin space is the image of a Polish space under a continuous mapping. So every Lusin space is Suslin.
In a Polish space, a subset is a Suslin space if and only if it is a Suslin set (an image of the Suslin operation).

The following are Suslin spaces:
 closed or open subsets of a Suslin space,
 countable products and disjoint unions of Suslin spaces,
 countable intersections or countable unions of Suslin subspaces of a Hausdorff topological space,
 continuous images of Suslin spaces,
 Borel subsets of a Suslin space.

They have the following properties:
 Every Suslin space is separable.

Radon spaces

Since a probability measure is globally finite, and hence a locally finite measure, every probability measure on a Radon space is also a Radon measure. In particular a separable complete metric space  is a Radon space.

Every Suslin space is Radon.

Polish groups
A Polish group is a topological group  that is also a Polish space, in other words homeomorphic to a separable complete metric space. There are several classic results of Banach, Freudenthal and Kuratowski on homomorphisms between Polish groups. Secondly, there is a version of the open mapping theorem or the closed graph theorem due to : a continuous injective homomorphism of a Polish subgroup  onto another Polish group  is an open mapping. As a result, it is a remarkable fact about Polish groups that Baire-measurable mappings (i.e., for which the preimage of any open set has the property of Baire) that are homomorphisms between them are automatically continuous. The group of homeomorphisms of the Hilbert cube  is a universal Polish group, in the sense that every Polish group is isomorphic to a closed subgroup of it.

Examples:
All finite dimensional Lie groups with a countable number of components are Polish groups. 
The unitary group of a separable Hilbert space (with the strong operator topology) is a Polish group.
The group of homeomorphisms of a compact metric space is a Polish group.
The product of a countable number of Polish groups is a Polish group.
The group of isometries of a separable complete metric space is a Polish group

See also
 Standard Borel space

References

Further reading
 

 

Descriptive set theory
General topology
Science and technology in Poland